Karl Vorse Krombein (26 May 1912 Buffalo, New York -  September 6, 2005 Lorton, Virginia) 
was an American entomologist specializing in Hymenoptera.

References
Bradley, J. C. 1959: The influence of the American Entomological Society upon the study of Hymenoptera. - Trans. Amer. Ent. Soc. 85(4) 277-301

External links
Biography of Krombein

American entomologists
Hymenopterists
1912 births
2005 deaths
Scientists from Buffalo, New York
People from Lorton, Virginia
Scientists from Virginia
20th-century American zoologists